This is a list of albums that charted in the top ten of the ARIA Album Charts, an all-genre albums chart, in 2017.

Top-ten albums
The list is sorted chronologically by issue date with the date representing the first issue in which the album appeared in the top ten in 2017, regardless of whether an album charted in a previous year or not. Dates reached peak position are in 2017 unless otherwise noted.

Key
(#) - 2017 Year-end top 10 album position and rank

Notes

References

2017 in Australian music
Australia Albums Top 10
Australian record charts